Last Flight to Abuja is a 2012 Nigerian disaster thriller film written by Tunde Babalola, directed and produced by Obi Emelonye, and starring Omotola Jalade Ekeinde, Hakeem Kae-Kazim and Jim Iyke. Shot in Lagos, the film received 5 nominations at the 2013 Africa Movie Academy Awards, winning the category "Best film by an African based abroad". On 15 June 2020, 'Last Flight To Abuja' began streaming on Netflix eight years after it first premiered in London.

Plot
On board the last flight of Flamingo Airways from Lagos to Abuja. It is a Friday night in 2006. The plane leaves on time and everything goes well until disaster strikes. While the pilots try to regain control of the flight, flashbacks reveal the reasons why each passenger took the flight and now have to face their destiny. Based on a true story.

Cast
Omotola Jalade-Ekeinde - Suzie
Hakeem Kae-Kazim - Adesola
Ali Nuhu - Dan
Jim Iyke - David
Anthony Monjaro - Aircraft captain
Uru Eke - Air hostess
Tila Ben - Passenger
Jide Kosoko - Chief Nike
Celine Loader - Captain Seye
Uche Odoputa - Efe
Jennifer Oguzie - Yolanda
Samuel Ajibola -
Ashaju Oluwakemi -
 Nneka J. Adams

Production
During the filming process, Emelonye had to deal with his peers, banks, and bureaucrats at Murtala Muhammed International Airport in Lagos.

Reception
Last Flight to Abuja received mixed reviews. Praised for its cinematography and music score, most critics stated that the CGI and visual effects left a lot to be desired. The film grossed ₦8,350,000 in its opening weekend with an attendance of 9,638, and went ahead to gross ₦24,000,000 in its first week, topping the chart in west African cinemas and beating Hollywood movies such as The Amazing Spider-Man, Think Like a Man, The Avengers and Madagascar 3.  It was released in many cities, including Lagos and London, where it was rated at 4 stars by Odeon cinemas.

See also

 List of Nigerian films of 2012

References

External links
 
 

2012 films
Films produced by Obi Emelonye
Films directed by Obi Emelonye
English-language Nigerian films
2010s disaster films
2012 action thriller films
Aviation films
Films shot in Lagos
Films set in Lagos
Films set in Abuja
Films set in 2006
Films set in the 2000s
Films set in Ilorin
Films set in Kwara
Disaster films based on actual events
Nigerian thriller films
Nigerian nonlinear narrative films
Nigerian films based on actual events
Best Film by an African Living Abroad Africa Movie Academy Award winners
2010s English-language films